Tavullia is a comune (municipality) in the Province of Pesaro e Urbino in the Italian region Marche, located about  northwest of Ancona and about  southwest of Pesaro. Until December 13, 1938 it was known as Tomba di Pesaro.

Tavullia is the home town of the legendary nine-time world motorcycle champion Valentino Rossi. His family built a dirt oval racetrack close to the town.

Geography
Tavullia borders the following municipalities: Gradara, Mondaino, Montecalvo in Foglia, Montegridolfo, Montelabbate, Pesaro, Saludecio, San Giovanni in Marignano, Vallefoglia.

History
The area of Tavullia was likely inhabited before the Middle Ages, though the first mentioned settlement is  a castle situated on the slopes of Monte Peloso, the "Castrum Montis Pilos Tumbao".
It was the location of violent clashes between the Malatesta family (Guelphs who ruled over the city of Rimini) and that of Montefeltro (Ghibellines). The largest battle  was fought in 1443 at Monteluro: the Sforza intervention  in favor of the Malatesta led  to their victory.
The territory was always littered with castles, many of which are now disappeared: that of Monteluro was subject of numerous battles for its strategic importance and now  only a few ruins remain.

Gallery

People

 Valentino Rossi (1979), Motorcycle Racer 9 times World Champion.
 Graziano Rossi (1954), Motorcycle Racer and father of Valentino Rossi.

References

External links
 Official website

Cities and towns in the Marche